Glyn Thomas Johns (born 15 February 1942) is an English musician, recording engineer and record producer.

Biography

Early history
Johns was born in Epsom, Surrey, England. He had three siblings, two older sisters and a younger brother, Andy. When Johns was 8 years old his mother enrolled him in the parish church choir where he eventually became head chorister. Johns expressed a fondness for his experience in the church choir commenting that it led to his further involvement in music and a career he had never expected to be involved in. Aside from the choir, his mother's brother, Robert, and the choirmaster/organist at St. Martin's Parish Church, Felton Rapley, also influenced and encouraged his interest in music.

Career in recording
Johns produced and/or engineered with artists such as Led Zeppelin, the Rolling Stones, the Beatles (Get Back sessions), the Who, Eagles, Bob Dylan, Linda Ronstadt, Johnny Hallyday, the Band, Eric Clapton, the Clash, Ryan Adams, the Steve Miller Band, Small Faces, Spooky Tooth, the Easybeats, the Ozark Mountain Daredevils, Blue Öyster Cult, Emmylou Harris, Midnight Oil, New Model Army, Belly, Joe Satriani, Ronnie Lane, Rod Stewart with Faces, John Hiatt, Joan Armatrading, Buckacre, Gallagher and Lyle, Georgie Fame, Family, Helen Watson, Fairport Convention, Humble Pie, and many others.

In the 1960s, while associated with the UK rock band the Presidents, Johns began working as a recording studio engineer at IBC Studios in Portland Place, London and was able to take the band in during weekends and try his skills at production and recording. Around 1964 Johns began his long association with the Rolling Stones, engineering every album release from December's Children (And Everybodys) through to the 1976 release Black and Blue. During 1969, Johns was called upon to rescue the troubled Get Back sessions for the Beatles. Johns compiled several versions of the album, which were all rejected by the band, before the project was eventually turned over to producer Phil Spector. Spector's version became the released album, which was retitled Let It Be which Johns called "a syrupy load of bullshit". During shooting, John Lennon famously referred to him as "Glynis" (with reference to the actress Glynis Johns).

In 1971, he produced, recorded and mixed The Who's Who's Next, continuing with the group until their album It's Hard.  His influence on Faces' 1971 album A Nod Is as Good as a Wink... to a Blind Horse, which he co-produced with the band, can be gauged from the message that follows the credits: "Thank you Glyn, you made all the difference." Johns produced the first two albums by the Eagles. Though they were successful, the band, especially Glenn Frey, clashed with Johns over the direction of their sound. After recording two songs for their third album (including their first No. 1 single "Best of My Love"), they dismissed Johns and returned to California to finish the album. Johns' output slowed in the mid 1980s, although he undertook work with Midnight Oil, Nanci Griffith, and Belly.

Johns also produced the 1977 Eric Clapton album Slowhand, including the popular hit "Wonderful Tonight", written by Clapton.

In 2011, after a couple of decades spent largely away from production, Johns produced and engineered Ryan Adams' album, Ashes & Fire. In February 2012, Johns began work on the Band of Horses album, Mirage Rock.

Johns and Eric Clapton collaborated once again for Clapton's 2016 release I Still Do, Clapton's 23rd album.

Family
Johns is the father of Ethan Johns and Abigail Amelia Claire Johns, the older brother of Andy Johns, and uncle of Will Johns. Ethan Johns has worked as an engineer and/or producer with artists such as Ryan Adams, Paul McCartney, Laura Marling, Ray LaMontagne and Kings of Leon, while Andy Johns has engineered with the Rolling Stones, Led Zeppelin and Jimi Hendrix, either on his own or under the tutelage of Eddie Kramer. Glyn's daughter Charley is a music publicist living in Los Angeles.

Approach to recording

Johns developed a unique approach to the recording of drums, often referred to as the "Glyn Johns Method". This technique usually employs three microphones:

 One hoisted several feet overhead to achieve natural perspective of the entire drum kit
 One off to the side not far from the floor tom
 One near to the bass drum

The key to the method is to keep both the overhead mic and the side-mic equidistant from, and pointed at, the centre of the snare, aimed in such a way that a triangular pattern is formed, with the three corners being the snare, the side-mic, and the overhead mic.

Johns himself says he places the mics equidistant within an inch or two, and places the overhead mic a little taller than his head when standing up. He recommends overdriving the mic preamps for the pair by 10 dB, and subsequently reducing the faders by the same amount.

Johns prefers not to close-mic the individual drums, but will occasionally spot mic the snare drum.

Autobiography
Johns has written a book about his life titled Sound Man published by Blue Rider Press on 13 November 2014.

Legacy
On 14 April 2012, Johns was inducted into the Rock and Roll Hall of Fame. He was honoured for musical excellence.

Discography

References

1942 births
Living people
British record producers
English record producers
English audio engineers
People from Epsom
Immediate Records artists